The District of Sankt Veit an der Glan is an administrative district in Carinthia, Austria.

Communities

The district is divided into 20 municipalities, of which 4 are towns and 9 are market towns.

Towns
Althofen (Slov.: Stari Dvor)(4,732)
Aich, Althofen, Eberdorf, Epritz, Krumfelden, Muraniberg, Rabenstein, Rain, Töscheldorf, Treibach
Friesach (Slov.: Breže)(5,462)
Dobritsch, Dobritsch, Dörfl, Engelsdorf, Friesach, Gaisberg, Grafendorf, Guldendorf, Gundersdorf, Gunzenberg, Gwerz, Harold, Hartmannsdorf, Hundsdorf, Ingolsthal, Judendorf, Kräuping, Leimersberg, Mayerhofen, Moserwinkl, Oberdorf I, Oberdorf II, Olsa, Pabenberg, Reisenberg, Roßbach, Sattelbogen, Schratzbach, Schwall, Silbermann, St. Johann, St. Salvator, St. Stefan, Staudachhof, Stegsdorf, Timrian, Wagendorf, Wels, Wiegen, Wiesen, Zeltschach, Zeltschachberg, Zienitzen, Zmuck
Sankt Veit an der Glan (Slov.: Šentvid ob Glini)(12,839)
Affelsdorf, Aich, Altglandorf, Arndorf, Baardorf, Baiersdorf, Beintratten, Blintendorf, Dellach, Draschelbach, Eberdorf, Galling, Gersdorf, Glandorf, Holz, Hörzendorf, Karlsberg, Karnberg, Laasdorf, Lebmach, Mairist, Milbersdorf, Muraunberg, Niederdorf, Pflugern, Pörtschach am Berg, Preilitz, Projern, Radweg, Raggasaal, Ritzendorf, St. Andrä, St. Donat, St. Veit an der Glan, Streimberg, Tanzenberg, Ulrichsberg, Unterbergen, Untermühlbach, Unterwuhr, Wainz
Straßburg (Slov.: Štrasberk)(2,335)
Bachl, Buldorf, Dielach, Dobersberg, Dörfl, Drahtzug, Edling, Gassarest, Glabötsch, Gruschitz, Gundersdorf, Hackl, Hausdorf, Herd, Hohenfeld, Höllein, Kraßnitz, Kreuth, Kreuzen, Kulmitzen, Langwiesen, Lees, Lieding, Machuli, Mannsdorf, Mellach, Mitterdorf, Moschitz, Olschnitz, Olschnitz-Lind, Olschnögg, Pabenberg, Pöckstein-Zwischenwässern, Pölling, Ratschach, Schattseite, Schmaritzen, Schneßnitz, St. Georgen, St. Jakob, St. Johann, St. Magdalen, St. Peter, Straßburg-Stadt, Unteraich, Unterfarcha, Unterrain, Wildbach, Wilpling, Winklern

Market Towns
Brückl (Slov.: Mostič)(3,110)
Brückl, Christofberg, Eppersdorf, Hart, Hausdorf, Johannserberg, Krainberg, Krobathen, Labegg, Michaelerberg, Oberkrähwald, Ochsendorf, Pirkach, Salchendorf, Schmieddorf, Selesen, St. Filippen, St. Filippen, St. Gregorn, St. Ulrich am Johannserberg, Tschutta
Eberstein (Slov.: Svinec)(1,505)
Baumgarten, Eberstein, Gutschen, Hochfeistritz, Kaltenberg, Kulm, Mirnig, Rüggen, St. Oswald, St. Walburgen
Gurk (Slov.: Krka)(1,311)
Dörfl, Finsterdorf, Föbing, Gassarest, Glanz, Gruska, Gurk, Gwadnitz, Hundsdorf, Kreuzberg, Krön, Masternitzen, Niederdorf, Pisweg, Ranitz, Reichenhaus, Straßa, Sutsch, Zabersdorf, Zedl, Zedroß, Zeltschach
Guttaring (Slov.: Kotarče)(1,565)
Baierberg, Dachberg, Deinsberg, Dobritsch, Gobertal, Guttaring, Guttaringberg, Höffern, Höffern, Hollersberg, Maria Hilf, Oberstranach, Rabachboden, Ratteingraben, Schalkendorf, Schelmberg, Schrottenbach, Sonnberg, St. Gertruden, Übersberg, Urtl, Urtlgraben, Verlosnitz, Waitschach, Weindorf
Hüttenberg (Slov.: Železni Hrib)(1,804)
Andreaskreuz, Gobertal, Gossen, Heft, Hinterberg, Hüttenberg, Hüttenberg Land, Jouschitzen, Knappenberg, Lichtegg, Lölling Graben, Lölling Schattseite, Lölling Sonnseite, Obersemlach, Semlach, St. Johann am Pressen, St. Martin am Silberberg, Stranach, Unterwald, Waitschach, Zosen
Klein Sankt Paul (Slov.: Mali Št. Pavel)(2,195)
Buch, Drattrum, Dullberg, Filfing, Grünburg, Katschniggraben, Kirchberg, Kitschdorf, Klein St. Paul, Maria Hilf, Mösel, Müllergraben, Oberwietingberg, Prailing, Prailing, Raffelsdorf, Sittenberg, Unterwietingberg, Wietersdorf, Wietersdorf, Wieting
Liebenfels (Slov.: Lepo Polje)(3,273)
Bärndorf, Beißendorf, Eggen I, Eggen II, Freundsam, Gasmai, Glantschach, Gößeberg, Graben, Gradenegg, Grassendorf, Grund, Hardegg, Hart, Hoch-Liebenfels, Hohenstein, Kraindorf, Kulm, Ladein, Lebmach, Liebenfels, Liemberg, Lorberhof, Mailsberg, Metschach, Miedling, Moos, Pflausach, Pflugern, Pulst, Puppitsch, Radelsdorf, Rasting, Reidenau, Rohnsdorf, Rosenbichl, Sörg, Sörgerberg, St. Leonhard, Tschadam, Waggendorf, Wasai, Weitensfeld, Woitsch, Zmuln, Zojach, Zwattendorf, Zweikirchen
Metnitz (Slov.: Metnica)(2,450)
Auen, Feistritz, Felfernigthal, Grades, Klachl, Laßnitz, Maria Höfl, Marienheim, Metnitz, Mödring, Oberalpe, Oberhof Schattseite, Oberhof Sonnseite, Preining, Schnatten, Schwarzenbach, Teichl, Unteralpe, Vellach, Wöbring, Zanitzberg, Zwatzhof
Weitensfeld im Gurktal (Slov.: Prečpolje ob Krki)(2,474)
Ading, Aich, Altenmarkt, Bach (Zweinitz), Braunsberg, Brunn (Zweinitz), Dalling, Dielach, Dolz, Edling, Engelsdorf, Grabenig, Grua, Hafendorf, Hardernitzen, Hundsdorf, Kaindorf, Kleinglödnitz, Kötschendorf, Kraßnitz, Lind, Massanig, Mödring, Mödritsch, Nassing, Niederwurz, Oberort, Planitz, Psein, Reinsberg, Sadin, St. Andrä, Steindorf, Traming, Tschriet, Weitensfeld, Wullroß, Wurz, Zammelsberg, Zauchwinkel, Zweinitz

Municipalities
Deutsch-Griffen (Slov.: Slovenj Grebinj)(1,023)
Albern, Arlsdorf, Bach, Bischofsberg, Brunn, Deutsch Griffen, Faulwinkel, Gantschach, Göschelsberg, Graben, Gray, Hintereggen, Hochrindl, Leßnitz, Meisenberg, Messaneggen, Mitteregg, Oberlamm, Pesseneggen, Ratzendorf, Rauscheggen, Sand, Spitzwiesen, Tanzenberg, Unterlamm
Frauenstein (Slov.: Ženji Kamen)(3,528)
Glödnitz (Slov.: Glodnica)(1,004)
Altenmarkt, Bach, Brenitz, Eden, Flattnitz, Glödnitz, Grai, Hohenwurz, Jauernig, Kleinglödnitz, Laas, Lassenberg, Moos, Rain, Schattseite, Torf, Tschröschen, Weißberg, Zauchwinkel
Kappel am Krappfeld (Slov.: Kapela na Krapskem polju)(2,107)
Boden, Dobranberg, Dürnfeld, Edling, Freiendorf, Garzern, Gasselhof, Geiselsdorf, Gölsach, Grillberg, Gutschen, Haide, Haidkirchen, Kappel am Krappfeld, Krasta, Krasta, Landbrücken, Latschach, Lind, Mannsberg, Mauer, Möriach, Muschk, Oberbruckendorf, Passering, Pölling, Poppenhof, Rattenberg, Schöttlhof, Silberegg, St. Florian, St. Klementen, St. Martin am Krappfeld, St. Willibald, Unterbergen, Unterpassering, Unterstein, Windisch, Zeindorf
Micheldorf (Slov.: Mihaelova vas)(1,201)
Gasteige, Gaudritz, Gulitzen, Hirt, Lorenzenberg, Micheldorf, Ostrog, Ruhsdorf, Schödendorf, Schödendorf
Mölbling (Slov.: Molnek)(1,273)
Bergwerksgraben, Breitenstein, Brugga, Dielach, Drasenberg, Eixendorf, Gaming, Gerach, Gratschitz, Gunzenberg, Kogl, Mail, Meiselding, Mölbling, Pirka, Rabing, Rastenfeld, Ringberg, St. Kosmas, St. Stefan am Krappfeld, Stein, Stein, Stoberdorf, Straganz, Treffling, Tschatschg, Unterbergen, Unterdeka, Wattein, Welsbach
Sankt Georgen am Längsee (Slov.: Šentjurij ob Dolgem jezeru)(3,551)
Bernaich, Dellach, Drasendorf, Fiming, Fiming, Garzern, Goggerwenig, Goggerwenig, Gösseling, Hochosterwitz, Kreutern, Krottendorf, Labon, Launsdorf, Maigern, Mail-Süd, Niederosterwitz, Pirkfeld, Podeblach, Pölling, Rain, Reipersdorf, Rottenstein, Scheifling, Siebenaich, St. Georgen am Längsee, St. Martin, St. Peter, St. Sebastian, Stammerdorf, Taggenbrunn, Thalsdorf, Töplach, Tschirnig, Unterbruckendorf, Unterlatschach, Weindorf, Wiendorf, Wolschart

(all populations are from the 2001 census)

 
Districts of Carinthia (state)